Charles Ewart (October 10, 1915 — April 30, 1990) was the head coach for the New York Bulldogs in the 1949 NFL season. Before the Bulldogs, Ewart was a backfield coach for the Philadelphia Eagles in 1946 and promoted to general manager for the Eagles in 1948. Outside of the National Football League, Ewart was an FBI agent during World War II and the vice president of American Bakeries Company.

Early life and education
Ewart was born on October 10, 1915 in Lynn, Massachusetts. He graduated from Yale University with a bachelor's degree and master's degree in the arts.

Career
Ewart began his American football career as a college football quarterback for Yale from 1935 to 1937. After college, he continued to work in college football as a backfield coach for Wesleyan University in 1940 and Dartmouth College the following year. In 1946, Ewart began working in the National Football League as a backfield coach for the Philadelphia Eagles. Ewart was promoted to general manager for the Eagles in 1948. After the Eagles won the 1948 NFL Championship Game, Ewart became the youngest general manager to win an NFL Championship.

The next year, he became the head coach of the New York Bulldogs in the 1949 NFL season. After the end of the season, Ewart resigned from the Bulldogs with 1 win, 10 losses and 1 tie. Outside of sports, Ewart was an FBI agent in World War II as a part of the Manhattan Project. At the end of his career, Ewart worked in the food industry as the vice president of American Bakeries Company and director of marketing for General Foods.

Death
Ewart died on April 30, 1990 in Elk Grove, Illinois.

References

1915 births
1990 deaths
American football quarterbacks
Dartmouth Big Green football coaches
New York Yanks coaches
Philadelphia Eagles coaches
Philadelphia Eagles executives
Wesleyan Cardinals football coaches
Yale Bulldogs football players
Federal Bureau of Investigation agents
People from Lynn, Massachusetts
Players of American football from Massachusetts